Harriet Lawrence (1883-1974) was one of the first female pathologists in the United States and the first known female pathologist in Oregon.

Life and education 
Harriet Jane Lawrence was born on September 13, 1883 in Kingsbury, Maine.

Lawrence attended college and medical school and paid her tuition by teaching. She was one of six women in her class when she graduated from Boston University School of Medicine in 1912. She later received the 1963 Distinguished Alumni Award from Boston University in acknowledgment of her contributions to medicine and work to advance women in the field.

Census records from 1920, 1930, and 1940 show that she was never married, but did have a daughter named Elizabeth.

Work in Portland 
She moved to Portland, Oregon in 1912 and began to work with Ralph Matson, who was a tuberculosis specialist. The next year, Lawrence opened her own laboratory in the Selling Building, where she worked for the next 50 years as a “microbe hunter." Lawrence lived on Peacock Lane in Portland, Oregon, where at one point she kept over 200 guinea pigs for use in experimentation with serums.

Lawrence became a fellow with the newly formed American Society of Clinical Pathologists in 1927. The goal of the organization was to advance the field of clinical pathology and ensure it was on equal ground with other specialized areas of medicine. She was a member of the Medical Club of Portland and the Philanthropic Educational Organization (P.E.O.) Sisterhood, which was an international organization that worked to provide educational opportunities for women. She helped Dr. Alan L. Hart in his 1917 transition from female to male and provided a recommendation for a position at the Albuquerque Sanatorium.

Work on the 1918 Influenza Pandemic 
She successfully created and helped distribute a serum therapy to treat those infected with the 1918 Flu Pandemic. She used a culture of the virus provided by the Oregon State Board of Health they obtained from a navy yard in Bremerton, Washington. It wasn't known at the time that the influenza was caused by a virus and Lawrence's serum targeted the secondary bacterial infection instead; however, President Woodrow Wilson honored Lawrence for her work.

Death 
She retired in 1967 and died in Portland February 28, 1974.

References

American women scientists
American pathologists
1974 deaths
1883 births
Boston University School of Medicine alumni
Physicians from Portland, Oregon
People from Piscataquis County, Maine